Bright Allotey (born 14 September 1991 in Accra) is a Ghanaian international footballer who plays as a defender for Great Olympics.

International career
Allotey his first call up was on 12 September 2009 for a friendly game against Argentina national football team, in this match made his international debut on 1 October 2009.

References

External links

1991 births
Living people
Ghanaian footballers
Ghana international footballers
Footballers from Accra
Accra Great Olympics F.C. players
Association football defenders